The Annual monitor is a list of British Quakers who died each year, between 1812 and 1919, including well over 20,000 persons. Most entries are basic data: age at death, date of death, names of parents or "widow of ...".  Some entries have a "memorial" (sometimes of several pages) giving biographical detail and a strong religious message.

The first issue was published in York by William Alexander (1768-1841), who was editor between 1813 and 1819. The project was initiated by William's wife, Ann Alexander (born Tuke, 1767-1849).

Editors

Succeeding editors were:
William Alexander (1768-1841)
Sarah Backhouse (1803-1877)
Samuel Tuke (1784-1857)
Benjamin Seebohm (1798-1871)
Esther Seebohm (1798?-1864)
Joseph Stickney Sewell (1819-1900)
John Newby (1806-1877)
William Robinson (1832-1908)
Francis Arnold Knight (1852-1915)

Numbering
No. 1-30 (1813-1842);
New Series No. 1-78 (1843-1919/20)
New Series. Nos. 67-70 (1909-1912) also issued as Nos. 96-99
New Series Nos. 71-78 (1913-1920) also issued as Nos. 101-108
Supplement to No. 22 (1834)

Indexes
Several cumulative indexes were produced, the most comprehensive being 
Quaker Records: Being an Index to "The Annual Monitor," 1813-1892, edited by Joseph J. Green (available online - see below) and Index 1893-1901 edited by W. Pumphrey

Title variation
Over the years, the title has varied thus:
The Annual monitor ; or, Newletter-case and memorandum book
The Annual monitor and memorandum book
The Annual monitor...being an obituary of members of the Society of Friends in Great Britain and Ireland

Annual Monitor Online
The  Quaker records Index 1813-1892 by Joseph Green  and the following years are available online (at 17 September 2012). Note the year given is the year of publication. The deaths recorded occurred in the previous year:

Before 1842 - not yet traced
 
1844 No. 2
1845 No. 3
1846 No.4
 1847 No.5
1848  No.6
1849 No.7
1850 No.8
1851 No.9 
1852 No.10
1853 No. 11
1854 No.12
1855 No.13
1856 No. 14
1857 No.15
1858 No.16
 1859 No.17
1860 No. 18
1861 No.19
 
1862 No. 20
1863 No.21
1864 No.22
1865 No. 23
1866 No. 24
1867 No.25
 1868 No.26
1869 No.27
 1870 No.28
1871 No. 29 
1872 No. 30
1873 No.31
1874 No.32
1875 No.33
1876 No.34
1877 - not yet traced
1878 No.36
1879 No.37
1880 No.38
1881 No.39
 
1882   - not yet traced
1883 No.41
1884 No.42
1885 No.43
1886  - not yet traced
1887 No. 45
1888 no.46
 1889 No.47
1890 No.48
1891 No.49
1892   - not yet traced
1893 No.51
1894 No.52
1895 No.53
1896 No.54
1897 No.55
1898 No.56
1899 No.57
1900   - not yet traced
1901 No.59
 
1902 No.60
1903 No. 61
1904 No.62
1905 No.63
1906 No. 64
1907 No.65
1908   - not yet traced
1909 No.96
1910  No. 97
1911 No. 98
1912 No.99
1913 no.101
1914 No.102
1915 No.103
1916 No.104
1917 No.105
1918 No.106
1919 - 1920  - not yet traced]

American Annual Monitor
An American Annual Monitor was published 1858 to 1863.

Notes and references

Sources
Catalogue of the Library of the Religious Society of Friends: Britain Yearly Meeting
Library of the Religious Society of Friends: Britain Yearly Meeting Subject Guide: Genealogy
The Internet Archive.

Notes

British Quaker texts
British biographical dictionaries
British Quakers
Annual publications